Movement for the United in Action Left ( abbreviated ΚΕΔΑ-KEDA) was a political party in Greece that was part of the Coalition of the Radical Left.

History
KEDA was formed in the early 2000s, by a splinter group of major party officials of the Communist Party of Greece (KKE), most prominently Yiannis Theonas (former MEP for KKE) and Mitsos Kostopoulos (ex-president of the parliamentary group of the KKE and ex-secretary general of the General Confederation of Greek Workers). However, Kostopoulos, left KEDA in May 2007.

References

External links

2000 establishments in Greece
2010s disestablishments in Greece
Defunct communist parties in Greece
Far-left politics in Greece
Components of Syriza
Political parties established in 2000
Political parties with year of disestablishment missing